Edward Thomas Simoneau (April 24, 1890 - February 1965) was an American politician who served as the twentieth Mayor of Marlborough, Massachusetts.

Judgeship
Simoneau was a Special Justice in the District Court of Marlborough, Massachusetts.

See also
 1927–1928 Massachusetts legislature

References

Mayors of Marlborough, Massachusetts
1890 births
1965 deaths
Place of birth missing
Place of death missing